Mateusz Dubowski (born 22 November 1992) is a Polish badminton player.

Achievements

BWF International Challenge/Series 
Men's singles

Men's doubles

  BWF International Challenge tournament
  BWF International Series tournament
  BWF Future Series tournament

References

External links 
 

1992 births
Living people
Sportspeople from Białystok
Polish male badminton players
20th-century Polish people
21st-century Polish people